The New Zealand National Party leadership election was an election for the National leadership position in 1997.

Background
Senior cabinet minister Jenny Shipley grew increasingly frustrated and disillusioned with the cautious pace of National's leader, Jim Bolger, and with what she saw as the disproportionate influence of coalition partner New Zealand First. She began gathering support to replace Bolger in mid-1997. Later that year, while Bolger attended the Commonwealth Heads of Government Meeting, Shipley convinced a majority of her National Party colleagues to back her bid for the leadership. Upon returning to New Zealand, Bolger, seeing that he no longer had the support of his party, resigned, and Shipley replaced him.

As leader of the governing party, she became Prime Minister on 8 December 1997.

Notes

References

National Party
1997
New Zealand National Party leadership election
National Party leadership election